Famous Birthdays is an American website based in Santa Monica, California, which is dedicated to cataloging the birthdays of famous people and compiling other facts about them.

Background
Founded in 2012 by Evan Britton, who has since described the website as "Wikipedia for Generation Z", Famous Birthdays originally focused on more traditional celebrities (such as actors, athletes, musicians, etc.), but has since expanded to also feature internet personalities. This shift came after Britton discovered that visitors were searching for individuals unfamiliar to him; at first mistaking the traffic as spam, he realized that the searches were of people with online followings such as Cameron Dallas.

Status
In 2015, Britton's eighteen-person team attended VidCon. , it had over 150,000 biographies. In July 2018, Famous Birthdays launched Famous Birthdays Español, a Spanish-language version of the site. In 2019, it had 20 million unique visitors each month. The same year, journalist Taylor Lorenz of The Atlantic described a Famous Birthdays page as a "status symbol" or "badge of honor" for internet personalities, noting its teenage and Generation Z demographic.

Features
Despite its name, Famous Birthdays also includes entire staff-written biographies. Each page has a "boost" button — each visitor who clicks this button will "boost" the biography higher up into the "trending" or "most popular" rankings. Online celebrities may canvass their followers into swaying them higher into the rankings by encouraging them to press the "boost" button.

References

External links

Companies based in Los Angeles
2012 establishments in California
American websites
Internet properties established in 2012
Generation Z